La La may refer to:

Music
  La la (music), a style of Louisianan Creole music

Albums
  L.A. L.A. (album), a retrospective album by Stiv Bators and also the name of a song by the artist

Songs
 "La La" (Ashlee Simpson song), a song by Ashlee Simpson from her 2004 album Autobiography
 "La La", an instrumental by Led Zeppelin, first released in the 2014 deluxe edition of their 1969 album Led Zeppelin II
 "La La", a song by Lil Wayne from his 2008 album Tha Carter III
 "La La", a song by Teairra Marí from her 2005 album Teairra Marí
 "The La La Song", a 2003 song by Marilyn Manson
 "LA LA", a song by Ski Mask the Slump God from his 2018 album Stokeley
 "L.A., L.A." (song), a song by Capone-N-Noreaga featuring Mobb Deep and Tragedy Khadafi
 "L.A. L.A.", single by Stiv Bators from L.A. L.A.
 "L.A. Love (La La)", a 2014 song by Fergie

People
 La La Anthony, American television personality and actress
 La Forrest 'La La' Cope, American songwriter

Other
 The La La's, a set of internationally renowned vineyards in the Cote-Rotie wine region of France

See also
 La (disambiguation)
 Lala (disambiguation)
 Lalla (disambiguation)
 La La La (disambiguation)
 La La Land (disambiguation)
 Ooh La La (disambiguation)
 Laa-Laa, a fictional character from the television series Teletubbies